Sisters of Suffocation is a death metal band, hailing from Eindhoven, Netherlands. The band was founded in 2014.

Biography
In April 2016, the band released a first single: Boundaries. The first EP Brutal Queen from 2016 was released independently. In September 2016, the EP was reissued by Hammerheart Records. The first album was released in 2017 on Suburban Records.

The band has performed at several festivals, including: Eindhoven Metal Meeting (NL), Stonehenge Festival (UK), Antwerp Metal Fest (Belgium), Gäfle Metal Fest (Sweden), Zwarte Cross (NL) and Lowlands (NL).

Band members
Current line-up
Els Prins - vocals
Simone van Straten - lead guitar
Emmelie Herwegh - rhythm guitar
Tim Schellekens - bass
Fons van Dijk - drums

Previous members
Puck Wildschut - bass
Marjolein van den Nieuwenhuizen - bass
Kevin van den Heiligenberg - drums
Amber de Buijzer - drums

Discography
Singles & EP's
 Boundaries (2014) - single
 Brutal Queen (2016) - EP, Hammerheart Records
 Shapeshifter (2017) - single
 I Swear (2018) - single

Studio albums
 Anthology of Curiosities (2017) - Suburban Records
 Humans Are Broken (2019)
 Eradication (2022)

External links

References

Dutch death metal musical groups